Princess Aisha bint Faisal of Jordan (born 27 March 1997) is the daughter of Prince Faisal bin Hussein and Princess Alia, and a niece of King Abdullah II of Jordan. She is the younger sister of Princess Ayah and Prince Omar, and is also the twin of Princess Sara. She attends Amman Baccalaureate School, a private school in Amman, Jordan.

Ancestry

References

Living people
1997 births
House of Hashim
Jordanian twins
Jordanian princesses
People educated at Amman Baccalaureate School
People from Amman
Jordanian people of English descent